The Church of the Saviour (Syracuse) is a chapel in the Episcopal Diocese of Central New York. It is an Anglo-Catholic Episcopal parish noteworthy for its historically significant architecture and decor, which took shape in the late nineteenth and early twentieth centuries.

The Church of the Saviour was first organized in Syracuse, New York in 1848 as St. James Church. It was only the second church established in the state of New York to have entirely free pews. After a series of fires, the building was replaced in 1891 with one designed by Syracuse architect Asa L. Merrick. Seven years later, after a bankruptcy auction, the parish was reorganized as the Church of the Saviour. Finally, after yet another fire, in 1912, the building interior was redesigned by the firm of Ralph Adams Cram, one the country's leading exponents of Gothic Revival architecture and proponent of Anglo-Catholic worship.

The interior of the Church of the Saviour features a rood beam carved in 1913 by Johannes Kirchmayer of Boston; an altar of Caen stone and Carrara marble, by the firm of J. and R. Lamb, dedicated in 1915; and a 2,000-pipe organ built by the M. P. Möller Company in 1962. The organ was built according to an unusual design created by the musicologist Ernest F. White, the Möller Company's tonal director, who also served as the Church of the Saviour's organist and musical director in 1962–1963. The building also contains a lady chapel and a wooden columbarium.

Sunday Eucharistic services at the Church of the Saviour are conducted according to rite I of the Book of Common Prayer, similar to the form of the liturgy used in Episcopal churches in the United States before 1979.

References 

Dodge, J. Roy. The Church of the Saviour: A History of the Parish. Privately published. 1997. Passim.
Hawke, H. William. "Ernest White." The Canadian Encyclopedia. 2009. . Retrieved 6 January 2014.
Keefe, Greg. "Syracuse Pipe Organ Holiday, August 11–14, 2014: The Organ Historical Society's 59th Annual Convention." . Retrieved 6 January 2014.
"About Us." . Retrieved 15 January 2011. 
 "Services." . Retrieved 15 January 2011.
"Brief History." . Retrieved 15 January 2011.
"The Episcopal Diocese of Central New York: Parishes." . Retrieved 15 January 2011.
"Asa L. Merrick (1848-1922)." Syracuse Then and Now. . Retrieved 15 January 2011.

External links 
The Church of The Saviour Syracuse - Home (Parish Website)
Potter, Horatio. "Free Will Offerings With an Holy Worship: A Sermon Preached at the Consecration of St James' Church, Syracuse, November 15, 1853." 

Episcopal church buildings in New York (state)
Churches in Syracuse, New York
Anglo-Catholic church buildings in the United States